The 2017–18 Eastern Illinois Panthers men's basketball team represented Eastern Illinois University during the 2017–18 NCAA Division I men's basketball season. The Panthers, led by sixth-year head coach Jay Spoonhour, played their home games at Lantz Arena as members of the Ohio Valley Conference. They finished the season 12–19, 7–11 in OVC play to finish in eighth place. They defeated Tennessee State in the first round of the OVC tournament before losing in the quarterfinals to Austin Peay.

Previous season 
The Panthers finished the 2016–17 season 14–15, 6–10 in OVC play to finish in fifth place in the West Division. They failed to qualify for the Ohio Valley Conference tournament.

Preseason 
After five years of divisional play in the OVC, the conference eliminated divisions for the 2017–18 season. Additionally, for the first time, each conference team will play 18 conference games.

In a vote of Ohio Valley Conference head men’s basketball coaches and sports information directors, Eastern Illinois was picked to finish sixth in the OVC.

Schedule and results

|-
!colspan=9 style=|Exhibition

|-
!colspan=9 style=|Non-conference regular season

|-
!colspan=9 style=| Ohio Valley Conference regular season

|-
!colspan=9 style=|Ohio Valley tournament

Source

References

Eastern Illinois Panthers men's basketball seasons
Eastern Illinois